The Doctor is In... and Out is an album by multi-instrumentalist Yusef Lateef recorded in 1976 and released on the Atlantic label.

Reception

Allmusic awarded the album 4½ stars with the review by Thom Jurek calling it "a weird and wonderful record".

Track listing 
All compositions by Yusef Lateef except as indicated
 "The Improvisers" - 7:55
 "Hellbound" (Kenny Barron) - 6:38
 "Mystique" (Barron) - 7:42
 "Mississippi Mud" - 2:53
 "Mushmouth" (Barron) - 6:28
 "Technological Homosapien" - 5:19
 "Street Musicians" - 2:57
 "In a Little Spanish Town ('Twas on a Night Like This)" (Sam M. Lewis, Mabel Wayne, Joe Young) - 3:26

Personnel 
Yusef Lateef - alto saxophone, tenor saxophone, oboe, flute, bamboo flute
Kenny Barron - keyboards
Leonard Goines, Joe Wilder - trumpet
Jack Jeffers - trombone
Jim Buffington - French horn
Jonathan Dorn - tuba
Dana McCurdy - ARP 2500
Billy Butler - guitar
Bob Cunningham, Ron Carter, Anthony Jackson - bass
Al Foster - drums
Dom Um Romao - percussion
Judy Clay, Cissy Houston - backing vocals
Bob Cunningham - narration (track 6)
David Nadien - violin (track 7)

References 

Yusef Lateef albums
1976 albums
Albums produced by Joel Dorn
Atlantic Records albums